Shuanggang station may refer to:

 Shuanggang station (Guangzhou Metro), a station on Guangzhou Metro in Guangzhou, Guangdong.
 Shuanggang station (Nanchang Metro), a station on Line 1 of Nanchang Metro in Nanchang, Jiangxi.
 Shuanggang station (Tianjin Metro), a station on Line 8 of Tianjin Metro in Tianjin.